Judex is the title of a 1916 silent French film serial concerning the adventures of Judex, who is a pulp hero, similar to The Shadow, created by Louis Feuillade and Arthur Bernède.

Plot
The story is complex and is told in 12 chapters. The basic plot involves a corrupt banker named Favraux, who is the target of Judex's revenge. It is eventually revealed that Judex's real identity is Jacques de Trémeuse, a man trying to avenge his family ruined by Favraux. Complicating matters is Favraux's beautiful and innocent daughter Jacqueline, with whom the avenger has fallen in love. A final element comes in the form of Diana Monti and her criminal gang who are working at cross purposes with Judex.

Cast
René Cresté - Jacques de Tremeuse a.k.a. Judex
Musidora - Diana Monti aka Marie Verdier
René Poyen - Le môme Réglisse
Édouard Mathé - Roger de Tremeuse
Gaston Michel - Pierre Kerjean
Yvonne Dario - Comtesse de Tremeuse
Yvette Andréyor - Jacqueline Aubry
Juliette Clarens - Gisèle
Jean Devalde - Robert Moralés
Georges Flateau - Vicomte de la Rochefontaine
Louis Leubas - Le banquier Favraux
Marcel Lévesque - Cocantin
Olinda Mano - Le petit Jean

Production

Development
Feuillade had made two earlier serials, Fantômas and Les Vampires, about cunning criminals.  Though popular with audiences, the serials both drew criticism for glorifying outlaws.  Feuillade answered these concerns by creating the hero Judex, who had the sinister trappings of the flamboyant villains so popular at the time.

Judex anticipated later pulp heroes and superheroes in many respects; he was a masterful fighter, an expert at disguise, and boasted a secret headquarters in the subterranean passages beneath a ruined castle - which was lavishly outfitted with high-tech gadgets.  His secret identity - Judex (Latin for judge) - was the nom-de-guerre he adopted in his quest for revenge. While Judex was derivative of Fantômas and Les Vampires, its story, with the hero's quest for revenge, bore many similarities with The Count of Monte Cristo.

Casting
Judex was played by French matinee idol René Cresté and Diana was played by Musidora, who had previously played the villainess Irma Vep in Les Vampires.

Episodes
These are the episode titles in French (with English translation)

 00 - Prologue
 01 - L'ombre mystérieuse (The Mysterious Shadow)
 02 - L'expiation (Atonement)
 03 - La meute fantastique (The Fantastic Hounds)
 04 - Le secret de la tombe (The Secret of the Tomb)
 05 - Le moulin tragique (The Tragic Mill)
 06 - Le môme réglisse (The Licorice Kid)
 07 - La femme en noir (The Woman in Black)
 08 - Les souterrains du Château-Rouge (The Dungeons of the Chateau Rouge)
 09 - Lorsque l'enfant parut (When the Child Appears)
 10 - Le coeur de Jacqueline (The Heart of Jacqueline)
 11 - L'Ondine (The Water Sprite)
 12 - Le pardon d'amour (The Forgiveness of Love)
 xx - Epilogue - 5 min. 24 sec.

The twelve numbered episodes average 25 minutes in length each.

Release
Though Judex was made in 1914, the outbreak of World War I delayed its release.  It was finally premiered in December 1916, and subsequently in wider release in 1916-1918.

A sequel serial was released in 1918 titled Judex's New Mission (La Nouvelle Mission de Judex).

See also
 Judex
 Judex (1934 film)
 Judex (1963 film)
 List of film serials
 List of film serials by studio

References

External links

 
 
Judex at Cool French Comics

Film serials
1916 films
French black-and-white films
Films directed by Louis Feuillade
French silent films
1916 adventure films
French adventure films
Silent adventure films